Sidthug is the first album by Luke Vibert under the alias Spac Hand Luke. The release was mastered by Matt Colton.

Track listing
Side A
"Sidthug" - 4:10
"Psycho" - 3:51
Side B
"Synkik" - 6:10
"Dynocock" - 4:06

References

2006 EPs
Luke Vibert EPs